An Unsuitable Job for a Woman is a British television mystery drama series, based upon the 1972 novel of the same name by P.D. James, that starred Helen Baxendale and Annette Crosbie. Two series were produced, each focusing on two separate feature-length dramas, each based in part upon the book of the same name and its 1982 sequel, The Skull Beneath the Skin. These aired on ITV between 24 October 1997 and 16 May 2001, also airing in the United States on PBS as part of their Mystery! series.

Baxendale stars as Cordelia Gray, a young, aspiring private detective learning the ropes from her mentor, disgraced ex-policeman Bernie Pryde (Jeff Nuttall). But when Pryde's sudden suicide leaves Cordelia the sole proprietor of his ramshackle agency, she is forced to continue her education on the job. With only Mrs Sparshott (Annette Crosbie), the agency's longtime secretary and her new assistant on the team, Cordelia finds herself thrust headfirst into unfamiliar waters. The complete series was released on DVD in the United States on 8 January 2008.

Cast
 Helen Baxendale as Cordelia Gray
 Annette Crosbie as Edith Sparshott
 Rosemary Leach as Miss Markland
 Struan Rodger as DCS Fergusson
 Angela Thorne as not given

Episodes

Series 1 (1997–1998)

Series 2 (1999)

References

External links

1997 British television series debuts
2001 British television series endings
1990s British drama television series
2000s British drama television series
1990s British television miniseries
2000s British television miniseries
ITV television dramas
English-language television shows
Television series by ITV Studios
Television shows produced by Harlech Television (HTV)
Television shows set in London
Television shows set in Somerset